The 2020–21 season of Petro de Luanda men's basketball team was the 41st in the existence of the club and the first in the Basketball Africa League (BAL).  

Petro won its 14th title and second consecutive title in the 2020–21 Angolan Basketball League, after the previous season was cancelled due to the COVID-19 pandemic. Interclube was defeated 3–0 in the playoff finals. In the BAL, Petro finished in the third place after defeating Patriots in the third place game.

Roster

Team

Additions

|}

BAL

Group phase

|- style="background:#cfc;"
| 1
| 18 May
| AS Police
| W 84–66
| Jone Pedro  (16)
| Jone Pedro (11)
| Childe Dundao (4)
| Kigali ArenaN/A
| 1–0
|- style="background:#cfc;"
| 2
| 20 May
| FAP
| W 64–66
| Antwan Scott (23)
| Pedro, Morais (10)
| Three players (3)
| Kigali ArenaN/A
| 2–0
|- style="background:#cfc;"
| 3
| 23 May
| AS Salé
| W 97–78
| Ryan Richards (19)
| Jone Pedro (10)
| Antwan Scott (7)
| Kigali ArenaN/A
| 3–0

Playoffs

|- style="background:#cfc;"
| Quarterfinals
| 26 May
| (6) AS Salé
| W 79–72
| Gerson Gonçalves (19)
| Gerson Gonçalves (10)
| Gerson Gonçalves (6)
| Kigali Arena543
| N/A
|- style="background:#fcc;"
| Semifinals
| 29 May
| (2) Zamalek
| L 89–71
| Carlos Morais (18)
| Jone Pedro (9)
| Dundao, Gonçalves (3)
| Kigali Arena704
| N/A
|- style="background:#cfc;"
| Third place
| 30 May
| (4) Patriots BBC
| W 97–68
| Valdelício Joaquim (21)
| Jone Pedro (9)
| Antwan Scott (7)
| Kigali Arena747
| N/A

Statistics

Source:

References

Petro de Luanda